Immersed in the Flames of Mankind is an independently released, full-length album by the band the Funeral Pyre. This is a follow-up to the EP, October.

Despite being a self-recorded album, the sound quality was perceived as very professional, for an unsigned and unsupported band. It has been praised for its use of blast beats and the distinction of its keyboard. All the artwork is credited to Tony Koehl.

All three of the tracks from their previous EP, October, "A Gradual Awakening", "World of Vengeance" and "Isengard Unleashed", had been rerecorded for this album.

Track listing

Personnel
Adam Campbell – bass guitar
Daniella Jones – keyboards
James Joyce – guitar
Alex Hernandez – drums
Jason Dunn – guitar
John Strachan – vocals

References

2004 albums
The Funeral Pyre albums